Vattappalai is a small town located in the Mullaitivu district in the Northern Province of Sri Lanka. It is home to a famous Amman Hindu temple located there.

See also
List of towns in Northern Province, Sri Lanka

External links

Populated places in Northern Province, Sri Lanka